Susanne Kirchmayr aka Electric Indigo (born 15 December 1965) is an Austrian music producer, Techno DJ and feminist who performs under the name Electric Indigo. Her stage name is a combined reference to her favorite color indigo and her affinity for electronic music.

She began her music career in 1989 in Vienna as a Jazz - and radio -DJ. Shortly thereafter, she shifted her style to focus on Detroit Techno and Chicago House. From 1993 to 1996, she lived in Berlin and was signed to the legendary record label Hard Wax. In 1998, Kirchmayr launched female:pressure an international platform for female DJs, producers and artists involved in electronic music. female:pressure is a web-based database for female talent and was created to promote mutual support and communication, and to provide a source of information about artists.

In 2002 she was invited to play the main stage at the Detroit Electronic Music Festival. In 2003, Kirchmayr founded her own label, Electric Indigo, indigo: inc recordings. In 2004 she started a collaboration with Mia Zabelka and Dorit Chrysler entitled colophony circuit .

In 2012, Kirchmayr was awarded the Outstanding Artist Award for Music of the Federal Ministry for Education and Women, Arts and Culture Award (Austria).

Discography 
 Electric Indigo: 5 1 1 5 9 3 (imbalance computer music) Mar. 2018
 Electric Indigo & Dorit Chrysler: Sheets (Chicks On Speed Records / Girl Monster compilation) Aug. 2006
 Exile remixed system - Electro Indigo: The Sons And The Beast (Pripuzzi 001) Nov. 2005
 Toktok - Dende ligand / Electro Indigo & Skin Man Remix (v-records) in September 2005
 Markus Güntner feat. Rich - Everybody / Electro Indigo Remix (Spring) May 2005
 Electro Indigo - Six-Trak Reworks 2 (indigo: inc) Dec. 2004
 T21 - Personal Feelings / Electro Indigo Remix (Le Maquis) Nov. 2004
 Electro Indigo - Six-Trak Reworks 1 (indigo: inc) Nov. 2004
 SPG - Yes We Are / Electro Indigo Remix Soundlab Entertainment Oct. 2004
 Gwenn Labarta - Vortexx voice track / Electro Indigo Remix (UMR 025) in September 2004
 Microthol - Sexy Lady / Electro Indigo Remix (indigo: inc) 2004
 Reinhard Voigt - How We Rock / Electro Indigo Remix ( Kompakt 91) 2003
 Electro Indigo - Six-Trak EP 2 (indigo: inc) 2003
 Electro Indigo - Six-Trak EP 1 (indigo: inc) 2003
 Electro Indigo / Acid Maria - World Tour Mix CD (True People) in 2003, feat. her tracks Beautiful Angelica, The Puzzle
 Electro Indigo - theme mix CD (theme) in 2002, feat. Indigo's Dirty Floor
 Electro Indigo - Tribute to Gazometer Mix CD (XXX Records) 2001
 Electro Indigo & David Carretta - I Want You (folk dance) 2000
 USA - Electro Indigo Mix CD (Petra) 2000
 Electro Indigo & David Carretta - Comin 'at You (Pornflake) 2000
 Electro Indigo & David Carretta - Machine ( International Deejay Gigolos ) 2000
 Electro Indigo - Hitchhiker (Mueller) 1999
 DJ Rush - Oh La La / Electro Indigo Mix (Mental Groove) 1996
 Electro Indigo Mix Tape (International Deejay Gigolos) 1996
 Loisaida Sisters - Home Cooking ep (Pharma) 1996
 Electro Indigo & Walker - Golden Gate Bridge (Temple) 1995
 Electro Indigo & Walker - SP 12 Trax (Djungle Fever) 1994
 Northstar - Figure Skating ep ( Disk B ) 1994
 DJ Hell - My Definition of House / North Star RMX, released on the album Tarred & feathered (Disk B) 1994
 North Star - Electro Silence / Energy 93 Compilation (Disk B) 1993
 Electro Indigo & Richard Bartz - Skyscraper (Disk B) 1993
 Electro Indigo - Skyway (Experimental, NY) 1993

See also
List of female electronic musicians

References

External links 
 indigo: inc recordings 
 Discogs
 female:pressure 
 colophony circuit cooperation of Electro Indigo, Mia Zabelka and Dorit Chrysler

Austrian record producers
Living people
Women in electronic music
1965 births
Austrian women record producers